Iran participated in the 2nd West Asian Games held in Kuwait City, Kuwait from April 3 to 12, 2002. Iran ranked 3rd with 9 gold medals in this edition of the West Asian Games.

Medal summary

Medal table

Medalists

References

External links
Official website

West Asian Games
Nations at the 2002 West Asian Games
West Asian Games